Jeppe Arctander Moe (born 3 August 1995) is a Norwegian football defender who currently plays for Eliteserien side Aalesund.

Jeppe Arctander Moe began his career in his local club Fossum IF but later got picked up by Stabæk at the age of 13. After a successful stint in Stabæk's boys and junior teams, he moved to Florida to study at Stetson University from the autumn of 2014 on a sports scholarship.

In 2016, he returned to Stabæk and signed a one-year contract with the senior team. After featuring in the early rounds of the 2016 Norwegian Football Cup, Moe made his league debut in May 2016 as a substitute against Rosenborg BK.

He grabbed his first Stabæk goal in a 7–1 victory against Sparta Sarpsborg in the Norwegian Cup, when he finished a short pass from teammate Ohi Omoijuanfo in the bottom corner in the 76th minute. He said in an interview after the game to the Stabæk official YouTube channel that he was very happy to get his first goal for the club, but also stated that they were not satisfied with not managing to keep a cleen sheet.

He came on as a substitute against Viking FK on 12 May 2016, to get his home debut at Nadderud Stadion in the 80th minute in a 1–0 victory. He stated to Stabæk's official Facebook page after the match that the feeling is not easy to describe and the most important thing was to get the 3 points.

May 21 he played his first full 90 minutes against Tromsø, but Stabæk did not manage to win, and suffered a 0–3 defeat. Jeppe said to the Stabæk official live stream before the match that 3 points was all that mattered in the game, but they failed to grab the 3 points but instead kept position in the lower ranks of the table in the relegation zone.

Career statistics

References

1995 births
Living people
Sportspeople from Bærum
Norwegian footballers
Norwegian expatriates in the United States
Stetson Hatters men's soccer players
Stabæk Fotball players
Aalesunds FK players
Eliteserien players
Association football defenders